Pam Oliver (born ) is an American sportscaster known for her work on the sidelines for various National Basketball Association (NBA) and National Football League (NFL) games.

Early life and education
Oliver was born in Dallas, Texas. She attended Niceville High School in Niceville, Florida, where she excelled in tennis, basketball, and track and field. At Florida A&M University, she was an All-American in both the 400-meter and the mile relay.

Professional career
Oliver began her broadcasting career at WALB in Albany, Georgia in 1985 as a news reporter. The next year, Oliver moved to WAAY-TV in Huntsville, Alabama. After that stop, Oliver moved to WIVB-TV in Buffalo, New York in 1988. Two years later in 1990, Oliver moved to WTVT in Tampa, Florida, where she began her career as a sports anchor in 1991. Oliver moved to KHOU-TV in Houston, where she continued to be a sports anchor.

In 1993, Oliver joined ESPN. In 1995, Oliver joined Fox Sports, where she worked as a sideline reporter with the network's number-one broadcast team, Pat Summerall and John Madden. In 2005, Oliver joined TNT as a sideline reporter for their NBA Playoffs coverage and worked as a Sideline Reporter for the NBA Playoffs on TNT until 2009.

On July 14, 2014, Fox moved her to the network's #2 NFL broadcasting team, while Erin Andrews took over as sideline reporter on the #1 crew.  In early  2015, Fox extended Oliver's sideline reporting job with the #2 team through the 2016 season. Oliver has continued in that role as of the 2022 season.

References

External links

 

Living people
American women journalists
African-American television personalities
American television sports announcers
Florida A&M Lady Rattlers track and field athletes
National Basketball Association broadcasters
National Football League announcers
Women sports announcers
Sportspeople from Dallas
People from Fort Walton Beach, Florida
American female sprinters
African-American female track and field athletes
African-American women journalists
African-American sports journalists
African-American sports announcers
21st-century African-American people
21st-century African-American women
20th-century African-American sportspeople
20th-century African-American women
20th-century African-American people
Year of birth missing (living people)